Dado may refer to:

Architecture and joinery
 Dado (architecture), an architectural term for the lower part of a wall
 Dado rail, a type of moulding fixed at mid-height horizontally to the wall
 Dado (joinery), a woodworking joint
 Dado set, a circular saw blade used for cutting dado joints

People
 Audoin (bishop) (609-686), Frankish bishop, courtier, chronicler and Catholic saint known as Dado
 Dado, Bishop of Verdun (880-923)
 Dado, Count of Pombia (died 980), Italian nobleman
 Diosdado Dado Banatao (born 1946), Filipino-American entrepreneur and engineer
 Luis Dado Cavalcanti (born 1981), Brazilian football manager
 David Dado Elazar (1925-1976), Israeli Army Chief-of-Staff
 Salvador Dado Marino (1915-1989), American flyweight world champion boxer
 Edgardo Dado Moroni (born 1962), Italian jazz pianist and composer
 Damir Dado Polumenta (born 1982), Montenegrin pop-folk singer
 Dado Pršo (born 1974), Croatian football player
 Alessandro Ruspoli, 9th Prince of Cerveteri (1924-2005), Italian playboy and occasional actor nicknamed "Dado"
 Dado Topić (born 1949), Croatian singer
 Dado (painter), Yugoslavian-born painter Miodrag Đurić  (1933–2010)
 Dado (street performer), stage name of Canadian street performer, magician and clown Daniel Warr
 Firehiwot Dado (born 1984), Ethiopian long-distance runner

Other uses
 Dado, Afghanistan, the district center of Zana Khan district in Ghazni Province
 Dado (band), an Uzbekistani pop band
 The Dado Center for Interdisciplinary Military Studies, an Israeli strategy think tank inside the Israel Defense Forces
 District Agriculture Development Office (DADO), local offices under Ministry of Agricultural Development (Nepal)

See also
 Little Dado, Filipino bantamweight and flyweight world champion boxer Eleuterio Zapanta (1916-1965)
 Speedy Dado, Filipino boxer Diosdado Posadas (1906-1990)